"The Politics of Dancing" is the debut single by English new wave band Re-Flex, released in 1983. It is the title track of their debut album. The song was written by keyboardist, backing vocalist, and band co-founder Paul Fishman.

The song has been used in many films over the years, including Firstborn (1984), Edge of Seventeen (1998), and Atomic Blonde (2017).

Background
Keyboardist Paul Fishman would record song ideas on a pocket tape recorder while walking or traveling near his home in Hampstead, London, and then sequence them on his Oberheim DSX back at his flat. He would work on the songs and present three or four at a time to his bandmates to jam out to at their next session. He said this song was probably inspired by a train or something he had read, and he took an almost complete demo of it with nearly finished lyrics to the session.

On the lyrics, Fishman said, "The sentiment of the song is really about the power of when people come together and express themselves through dancing and letting go. During the '80s, it was in its very early days but in the latter part of the decade the rave scene was pretty much the message in a nut shell. No, I don’t think people generally understand messages but some get it so that’s alright."

Charts

References

External links
Song info & Music video

1982 songs
1983 debut singles
Re-Flex songs
EMI Records singles
Songs about dancing
Song recordings produced by John Punter